Toe tights are tights with individual toes, in the same way toe socks are socks with individual toes.

They are Japan-exclusive novelty items.

References
Toe Tights: like toe socks, only pantyhose

Hosiery